Nikola Milošević (born April 7, 2001) is a Croatian professional junior water polo player. He is currently playing for VK Primorje at the position of a  goalkeeper. He is 6 ft 6 in (1.97 m) tall and weighs 220 lb (100 kg).

References

Croatian male water polo players
2001 births
Living people